The United States Forest Service (USFS) is an agency of the U.S. Department of Agriculture that administers the nation's 154 national forests and 20 national grasslands. The Forest Service manages  of land. Major divisions of the agency include the Chief's Office, National Forest System, State and Private Forestry, Business Operations, and Research and Development. The agency manages about 25% of federal lands and is the only major national land management agency not part of the U.S. Department of the Interior (which manages the National Park Service, the U.S. Fish and Wildlife Service, and the Bureau of Land Management).

History 

The concept of national forests was born from Theodore Roosevelt's conservation group, Boone and Crockett Club, due to concerns regarding Yellowstone National Park beginning as early as 1875. In 1876, Congress formed the office of Special Agent in the Department of Agriculture to assess the quality and conditions of forests in the United States. Franklin B. Hough was appointed the head of the office. In 1881, the office was expanded into the newly formed Division of Forestry. The Forest Reserve Act of 1891 authorized withdrawing land from the public domain as forest reserves managed by the Department of the Interior. In 1901, the Division of Forestry was renamed the Bureau of Forestry.

The Transfer Act of 1905 transferred the management of forest reserves from the General Land Office of the Interior Department to the Bureau of Forestry, henceforth known as the United States Forest Service. Gifford Pinchot was the first United States Chief Forester in the Presidency of Theodore Roosevelt.

A historical note to include is that the National Park Service was created in 1916 to manage Yellowstone and several other parks; in 1956, the Fish and Wildlife Service became the manager of lands reserved for wildlife. The Grazing Service and the General Land Office were combined to create the Bureau of Land Management in 1946. Also of note was that it was not until 1976 that the Federal Land Policy and Management Act became the national policy for retaining public land for federal ownership.

Significant federal legislation affecting the Forest Service includes the Weeks Act of 1911, the Multiple Use – Sustained Yield Act of 1960, P.L. 86-517; the Wilderness Act, P.L. 88-577; the National Forest Management Act, P.L. 94-588; the National Environmental Policy Act, P.L. 91–190; the Cooperative Forestry Assistance Act, P.L. 95-313; and the Forest and Rangelands Renewable Resources Planning Act, P.L. 95-307.

The Government Accountability Office did not offer a recommendation. The Forest Service remains a part of the USDA.

Organization

Overview 

As of 2019, FY 2020 Forest Service total budget authority is $5.14 billion, a decrease of $815 million from 2019. The budget includes $2.4 billion for Wildland Fire Management, a decrease of $530 million from the 2019 Annualized Continuing Resolution because the “fire fix” cap adjustment becomes available in FY 2020, while the FY 2019 Annualized Continuing Resolution includes $500 million above the base as bridge to the first year of the fire fix.

The Forest Service, headquartered in Washington, D.C., has 27,062 permanent, full-time employees as of Sept. 20, 2018, including 541 in the headquarters office and 26,521 in regional and field office.

The USDA Forest Service's mission is to sustain the health, diversity, and productivity of the Nation's forests and grasslands to meet the needs of present and future generations. Its motto is "Caring for the land and serving people."

As the lead federal agency in natural resource conservation, the Forest Service provides leadership in the protection, management, and use of the nation's forest, rangeland, and aquatic ecosystems. The agency's ecosystem approach to management integrates ecological, economic, and social factors to maintain and enhance the quality of the environment to meet current and future needs. Through implementation of land and resource management plans, the agency ensures sustainable ecosystems by restoring and maintaining species diversity and ecological productivity that helps provide recreation, water, timber, minerals, fish, wildlife, wilderness, and aesthetic values for current and future generations of people.

The everyday work of the Forest Service balances resource extraction, resource protection, and providing recreation. The work includes managing  of national forest and grasslands, including  of roadless areas; 14,077 recreation sites;  of trails;  of roads; and the harvesting of 1.5 billion trees per year.

The Forest Service organization includes ranger districts, national forests, regions, research stations and research work units and the Northeastern Area Office for State and Private Forestry. Each level has responsibility for a variety of functions.

National Places 
The Chief of the Forest Service is a career federal employee who oversees the agency. The Chief reports to the Under Secretary for Natural Resources and Environment in the U.S. Department of Agriculture, an appointee of the President confirmed by the Senate. The Chief's staff provides broad policy and direction for the agency, works with the Administration to develop a budget to submit to Congress, provides information to Congress on accomplishments, and monitors activities of the agency. There are five deputy chiefs for the following areas: National Forest System, State and Private Forestry, Research and Development, Business Operations, and Finance.

Research stations and research work units 

The Forest Service Research and Development deputy area includes five research stations, the Forest Products Laboratory, and the International Institute of Tropical Forestry, in Puerto Rico. Station directors, like regional foresters, report to the Chief. Research stations include Northern, Pacific Northwest, Pacific Southwest, Rocky Mountain, and Southern. There are 92 research work units located at 67 sites throughout the United States. there are 80 Experimental Forests and Ranges that have been established progressively since 1908; many sites are more than 50 years old. Individual sites range from 47 to 22,500 ha in size.

Operations of Experimental Forests and Ranges are directed by local research teams for the individual sites, by Research Stations for the regions in which they are located, and at the level of the Forest Service.

Major themes in research at the Experimental Forests and Ranges includes:
develop of systems for managing and restoring forests, range lands, and watersheds; investigate the workings of forest and stream ecosystems; characterize plant and animal communities; observe and interpret long-term environmental change and many other themes.

Regions 

There are nine regions in the Forest Service; numbered 1 through 10 (Region 7 was eliminated
in 1965 when the current Eastern Region was created from the former Eastern and
North Central regions.
). Each encompasses a broad geographic area and is headed by a regional forester who reports directly to the Chief. The regional forester has broad responsibility for coordinating activities among the various forests within the region, for providing overall leadership for regional natural resource and social programs, and for coordinated regional land use planning.
Northern Region: based in Missoula, Montana, the Northern Region (R1) covers six states (Montana, Northern Idaho, North Dakota, Northwestern South Dakota, Northeast Washington, and Northwest Wyoming), twelve National Forests and one National Grassland.
 Rocky Mountain: based in Golden, Colorado, the Rocky Mountain Region (R2) covers five states (Colorado, Nebraska, Kansas and most of Wyoming and South Dakota), sixteen National Forests and seven National Grasslands.
Southwestern: based in Albuquerque, New Mexico, the Southwestern Region (R3) covers two states (New Mexico and Arizona) and eleven National Forests.

Intermountain: based in Ogden, Utah, the Intermountain Region (R4) covers four states (Southern Idaho, Nevada, Utah and Western Wyoming), twelve national forests.
Pacific Southwest: based in Vallejo, California, The Pacific Southwest Region (R5) covers two states (California and Hawaii), eighteen National Forests and one Management Unit.
 Pacific Northwest: based in Portland, Oregon the Pacific Northwest Region (R6) covers two states (Washington and Oregon), seventeen National Forests, one National Scenic Area, one National Grassland, and two National Volcanic Monuments.
 Southern: based in Atlanta, Georgia, the Southern Region (R8) covers thirteen states (Alabama, Arkansas, Florida, Georgia, Kentucky, Louisiana, Mississippi, North and South Carolina, Tennessee, Texas, Oklahoma and Virginia; and Puerto Rico and the US Virgin Islands), and thirty-four National Forests.
 Eastern: based in Milwaukee, Wisconsin, the Eastern Region (R9) covers twenty states (Maine, Illinois, Ohio, Michigan, Wisconsin, Minnesota, Iowa, Missouri, Indiana, Pennsylvania, West Virginia, Maryland, New York, Connecticut, Rhode Island, Massachusetts, Vermont, New Hampshire, Delaware, and New Jersey), seventeen National Forests, one Grassland and America's Outdoors Center for Conservation, Recreation, and Resources.
 Alaska: based in Juneau, Alaska, the Alaska Region (R10) covers one state (Alaska), and two National Forests.

National Forest or Grassland 

The Forest Service oversees 155 national forests, 20 grasslands, and one tall-grass prairie. Each administrative unit typically comprises several ranger districts, under the overall direction of a forest supervisor. Within the supervisor's office, the staff coordinates activities among districts, allocates the budget, and provides technical support to each district. Forest supervisors are line officers and report to regional foresters.

Ranger District 
The Forest Service has over 600 ranger districts. Each district has a staff of 10 to 300 people under the direction of a district ranger, a line officer who reports to a forest supervisor. Most on-the-ground activities occur on ranger districts, including trail construction and maintenance, operation of campgrounds, oversight of a wide variety of special use permitted activities, and management of vegetation and wildlife habitat.

Major divisions

Law Enforcement & Investigations 

U.S. Forest Service Law Enforcement & Investigations (LEI), headquartered in Washington, D.C., is a federal law enforcement agency of the U.S. government. It is responsible for enforcement of federal laws and regulations governing national forest lands and resources. All law enforcement officers and special agents receive their training through Federal Law Enforcement Training Center (FLETC).

Operations are divided into two major functional areas:

 Law enforcement: uniformed, high-visibility enforcement of laws
 Investigations: special agents who investigate crimes against property, visitors, and employees

Uniformed Law Enforcement Officers (LEOs) enforce federal laws and regulations governing national forest lands and resources. LEOs also enforce some or all state laws on National Forest Lands. As part of that mission, LEOs carry firearms, defensive equipment, make arrests, execute search warrants, complete reports, and testify in court. They establish a regular and recurring presence on a vast amount of public lands, roads, and recreation sites. The primary focus of their jobs is the protection of natural resources, protection of Forest Service employees and the protection of visitors. To cover the vast and varied terrain under their jurisdiction, they use Ford Crown Victoria Police Interceptors, special service SUVs, horses, K-9 units, helicopters, snowmobiles, dirt bikes, and boats.

Special Agents are criminal investigators who plan and conduct investigations concerning possible violations of criminal and administrative provisions of the Forest Service and other statutes under the United States Code. Special agents are normally plainclothes officers who carry concealed firearms, and other defensive equipment, make arrests, carry out complex criminal investigations, present cases for prosecution to U.S. Attorneys, and prepare investigative reports. All field agents are required to travel a great deal and usually maintain a case load of ten to fifteen ongoing criminal investigations at one time. Criminal investigators occasionally conduct internal and civil claim investigations.

National Forest System 

The  of public land that are managed as national forests and grasslands are collectively known as the National Forest System. These lands are located in 44 states, Puerto Rico, and the Virgin Islands and comprise about 9% of the total land area in the United States. The lands are organized into 155 national forests and 20 national grasslands. The mission of the National Forest System is to protect and manage the forest lands so they best demonstrate the sustainable multiple-use management concept, using an ecological approach, to meet the diverse needs of people.

State and Private Forestry 
The goal of the State and Private Forestry program is to assist with financial and technical assistance to private landowners, state agencies, tribes, and community resource managers. It provides assistance by helping sustain the United States' urban and rural forests and their associated communities from wildland fires, insects, disease, and invasive organisms. Approximately 537 staff are employed in the program and is administered through National Forest System regions and the Northeastern Area of the United States.

Research and development 

The research and development (R&D) arm of the Forest Service works to improve the health and use of the United States' forests and grasslands. Research has been part of the Forest Service mission since the agency's inception in 1905. Today, Forest Service researchers work in a range of biological, physical, and social science fields to promote sustainable management of United States' diverse forests and rangelands. Research employs about 550 scientists and several hundred technical and support staff, located at 67 sites throughout the United States and in Puerto Rico. Discovery and technology development and transfer is carried out through seven research stations.

Research focuses on informing policy and land management decisions and includes addressing invasive insects, degraded river ecosystems, or sustainable ways to harvest forest products. The researchers work independently and with a range of partners, including other agencies, academia, nonprofit groups, and industry. The information and technology produced through basic and applied science programs is available to the public for its benefit and use.

In addition to the Research Stations, the USFS R&D branch also leads several National Centers such as the National Genomics Center for Wildlife and Fish Conservation.

International programs 
The Forest Service plays a key role in formulating policy and coordinating U.S. support for the protection and sound management of the world's forest resources. It works closely with other agencies such as USAID, the State Department, and the Environmental Protection Agency, as well as with nonprofit development organizations, wildlife organizations, universities, and international assistance organizations. The Forest Service's international work serves to link people and communities striving to protect and manage forests throughout the world. The program also promotes sustainable land management overseas and brings important technologies and innovations back to the United States. The program focuses on conserving key natural resource in cooperation with countries across the world.

Activities 

Although a large volume of timber is logged every year, not all National Forests are entirely forested. There are tidewater glaciers in the Tongass National Forest in Alaska and ski areas such as Alta, Utah in the Wasatch-Cache National Forest. In addition, the Forest Service is responsible for managing National Grasslands in the midwest. Furthermore, areas designated as wilderness by acts of Congress, prohibit logging, mining, road and building construction and land leases for purposes of farming and or livestock grazing.

Since 1978, several Presidents have directed the USFS to administer National Monuments inside of preexisting National Forests.

 Admiralty Island National Monument – Alaska
 Giant Sequoia National Monument – California
 Misty Fjords National Monument – Alaska
 Mount St. Helens National Volcanic Monument – Washington
 Newberry National Volcanic Monument – Oregon
 Santa Rosa and San Jacinto Mountains National Monument – California (jointly with the Bureau of Land Management)

The Forest Service also manages Grey Towers National Historic Site in Milford, Pennsylvania, the home and estate of its first Chief, Gifford Pinchot.

Fighting fires 

In August 1944, to reduce the number of forest fires, the Forest Service and the Wartime Advertising Council began distributing fire education posters featuring a black bear. The poster campaign was a success; the black bear would later be named Smokey Bear, and would, for decades, be the "spokesbear" for the Forest Service. Smokey Bear has appeared in innumerable TV commercials; his popular catch phrase, "Only YOU can prevent forest fires"—later changed to wildfires—is one of the most widely recognized slogans in the United States. According to the  Advertising Council, Smokey Bear is the most recognized icons in advertising history and has appeared almost everywhere via Public Service Announcements in print, radio, television. Smokey Bear, an icon protected by law, is jointly owned by the Forest Service, the Ad Council and the National Association of State Foresters.

In September 2000, the Departments of Agriculture and the Interior developed a plan to respond to the fires of 2000, to reduce the impacts of these wildland fires on rural communities, and to ensure sufficient firefighting resources in the future. The report is entitled "Managing the Impacts of Wildfire on Communities and the Environment: A Report to the President In Response to the Wildfires of 2000"—The National Fire Plan for short. The National Fire Plan continues to be an integral part of the Forest Service today. The following are important operational features of the National Fire Plan:

Federal Wildland Fire Management Policy: The 1995 Federal Wildland Fire Management Policy and the subsequent 2001 Federal Wildland Fire Management Policy act as the foundation of the National Fire Plan.
Basic Premise of the National Fire Plan: Investing now in an optimal firefighting force, hazardous fuels reduction, and overall community protection will provide for immediate protection and future cost savings.
Funding: Initially (2001), the National Fire Plan provided for an additional $1,100,994,000 for the Forest Service for a total wildland fire management budget of $1,910,193,000. In 2008, the total amount for the Forest Service in wildland fire management (not including emergency fire suppression funding) is $1,974,276,000.

In August 2014, Tom Vilsack, the Secretary of Agriculture, announced that the agency will have to put $400 to $500 million in wildfire prevention projects on hold because funding for firefighting is running low as the fiscal year ends. The decision is meant to preserve resources for fighting active fires burning in California, Oregon, Washington and Idaho. Politicians of both parties have indicated that they believe the current funding structure is broken, but they have not agreed on steps to fix the funding allocation.

During the 2019–2020 bushfires in Australia, the US Forest Services sent a contingent of firefighters. They worked alongside firefighters from other American fire departments.

Budget 
Although part of the Department of Agriculture, the Forest Service receives its budget through the Subcommittee on Appropriations—Interior, Environment, and Related Agencies.

Popular culture 

The Forest Service achieved widespread awareness during the 1960s, as it became the setting for the long running classic TV show Lassie, with storylines focusing on Lassie's adventures with various forest rangers.

The iconic collie's association with the Forest Service led to Lassie receiving numerous awards and citations from the U.S. Senate and the Department of Agriculture, and was partly responsible for a bill regarding soil and water pollution that was signed into law in early 1968 by President Lyndon Johnson, which was dubbed by some as "The Lassie Program".

In the 2019 family comedy movie Playing With Fire, John Cena plays a U.S. Forest Service firefighter who (along with his crew) watches over a group of rambunctious children while searching for their parents after rescuing them from a fire in the wilderness during a family vacation.

Controversies 
The history of the Forest Service has been fraught with controversy, as various interests and national values have grappled with the appropriate management of the many resources within the forests. These values and resources include grazing, timber, mining, recreation, wildlife habitat, and wilderness. Because of continuing development elsewhere, the large size of National Forests have made them de facto wildlife reserves for a number of rare and common species. In recent decades, the importance of mature forest for the spotted owl and a number of other species led to great changes in timber harvest levels.

In the 1990s, the agency was involved in scandal when it illegally provided surplus military aircraft to private contractors for use as airtankers in 1980s (see U.S. Forest Service airtanker scandal).

The policy on road building within the National Forests is another controversial issue: In 1999, President Clinton ordered a temporary moratorium on new road construction in the National Forests to "assess their ecological, economic, and social values and to evaluate long-term options for their management." The Bush administration replaced this five and half years later, with a system where each state could petition the Forest Service to open forests in their territory to road building.

Some years the agency actually loses money on its timber sales.

A 2017 draft report describing the legal basis which provides federal land managers a scope of decision making authority exceeding that of state fish and game departments has proven unexpectedly controversial.

In 2018 the Forest Service was reprimanded by the 4th U.S. Circuit Court of Appeals. The Service had issued permits for the Atlantic Coast Pipeline to build through parts of the George Washington and Monongahela National Forests and a right of way across the Appalachian Trail – in violation of both the National Forest Management Act and the National Environmental Policy Act.

Notable members
Michael Dombeck
Franklin B. Hough
Annie E. Hoyle
Aldo Leopold
Gifford Pinchot
Ed Pulaski
Jack Ward Thomas
Theodore Woolsey
James B. Yule
Raphael Zon

See also 

American Experience (season 27) "The Big Burn" (2014)
Architects of the United States Forest Service
Forests of the United States
List of legislation governing the United States Forest Service
National Forest Foundation
Range Improvement Funds
Recreation Residences

References

Further reading

History sources
USDA Forest Service – The First Century
100 Years of Federal Forestry
History of the Boone and Crockett Club Pg 64-80

Research
 Historic technical reports from the Forest Service (and other Federal agencies) are available in the Technical Report Archive and Image Library (TRAIL)

Education
The Greatest Good documentary
"The Greatest Good:100years"
Smokey Bear
Wildlife Crossings Toolkit The Wildlife Crossings Toolkit provides information for terrestrial biologists, engineers, and transportation professionals to assist in maintaining or restoring habitat connectivity across transportation infrastructure on public lands.

External links 

 
 USFS Wildland Fire Assessment System WFAS (interactive map of wildfire risk)
 
 

 
Forestry agencies in the United States
Nature conservation organizations based in the United States
Government agencies established in 1905
Forest Service
Forest research institutes
Federal law enforcement agencies of the United States
Park police departments of the United States
1905 establishments in the United States